What's New, Mr. Magoo? is an American animated television series which aired on Saturday mornings from September 10 to December 24, 1977, on CBS. It was produced by DePatie-Freleng Enterprises and United Productions of America. The series has the voices of Jim Backus, Bob Ogle, Casey Kasem, Hal Smith and Frank Welker.

This was the third series starring Mr. Magoo, following the 1960-1962 Mister Magoo, and the 1964-1965 show The Famous Adventures of Mr. Magoo.

It was one of only two animated series from DePatie-Freleng Enterprises---besides Bailey's Comets---to air on the CBS Television Network.

Cast
 Jim Backus as Mr. Magoo 
 Bob Ogle as McBarker
 Casey Kasem as Waldo
 Hal Smith	
 Frank Welker
 Daws Butler
 Paul Winchell

Episodes

References

External links
 

1977 American television series debuts
1977 American television series endings
1970s American animated television series
American animated television spin-offs
American children's animated comedy television series
Television series by DePatie–Freleng Enterprises
Television series by Universal Television
English-language television shows
Mr. Magoo
CBS original programming